Diamond Langi (born 9 January 1992) is a Tongan-New Zealand model, actress, singer, and beauty pageant titleholder who was crowned Miss Universe New Zealand 2019. She represented New Zealand at the Miss Universe 2019 competition, but failed to make the Top 20.

Personal life 
Diamond Langi was born on 9 January 1992 in Auckland; both her parents are from Tonga where she hails from the village of Vaini, Tongatapu. Langi was raised in Salt Lake City, Utah in the United States, and later moved to Sydney and now resides in Auckland, New Zealand. Diamond is an international model, actress, and a on camera host/journalist with a background in music. Diamond Langi has graduated with her Masters in Advanced Professional styling at Australian Style Institute.

Pageantry

Miss Pacific Islands 2012
Langi began her pageantry career when she competed as Miss Bou's Fashion at the annual Miss Heilala pageant in 2012 where the winner competes as Miss Tonga at the Miss Pacific Islands pageant. Diamond placed 4th winning the Sarong (Swim Wear) category.

Miss Earth Tonga 2017
Langi was crowned Miss Earth Tonga 2017 and then competed at Miss Earth 2017 pageant in Manila, Philippines.

Miss Earth 2017
Langi represented Tonga at Miss Earth 2017 in the Philippines and placed in the Top 16 finalist.

Miss Universe New Zealand 2019
Langi returned to her pageantry career to compete at Miss Universe New Zealand 2019 on August 17, 2019, where she won the title of Miss Universe New Zealand 2019.

Miss Universe 2019
Langi represented New Zealand at Miss Universe 2019 pageant. During the preliminary swimsuit competition, she got one of her high heels stuck in her long cape and nearly avoided falling on stage. Langi ultimately went unplaced.

References

External links 
 

1992 births
Female models from Utah
Living people
Miss Earth 2017 contestants
Miss Universe 2019 contestants
Models from Sydney
New Zealand beauty pageant winners
New Zealand expatriates in Australia
New Zealand expatriates in the United States
New Zealand female models
New Zealand people of Tongan descent
People from Auckland
People from Salt Lake City
21st-century American women